Red Star Rising or Dragonseye is a science fiction novel by the American-Irish author Anne McCaffrey. It was the fourteenth book published in the Dragonriders of Pern series by Anne or her son Todd McCaffrey.

Red Star Rising, or Red Star Rising: Second Chronicles of Pern, was published by Bantam UK in 1996. For release in the United States the following year it was retitled Dragonseye.

Plot introduction
After the events of All the Weyrs of Pern, The Dolphins of Pern, and The Skies of Pern, Thread is less of a threat to the planet. Returning to an earlier time period in Pernese history, the author brings the earlier conflict of Thread reappearing in the Second Pass. The book is set about 250 years after the Landing (the original settlement on Pern) and consequently it only features characters which do not appear in other books of the series.

Following in the footsteps of the novels that established the background of the colony, the book exposes the incremental loss of technology due to the hardships of thread, and inevitable progress towards the more feudal society shown later in the series timeline. It answers such questions as:
 What happened to the computers?
 What happened to the technology?
 Who created the Star Stones?
It also shows more about the process of caring for a newborn dragon than is shown in any of the other Pern books, and explores the ramifications of male riders of green dragons.

The main characters are Clisser (college head, Fort Hold), Chalkin (Lord Holder, Bitra), K'vin (weyrleader, Telgar), Zulaya (weyrwoman, Telgar), Iantine (journeyman artist) and Debera (green rider, Telgar).

Notes

References

External links

1996 novels
1996 science fiction novels
Dragonriders of Pern books
Novels by Anne McCaffrey
Novels with gay themes
British LGBT novels